Cvijić is a Serbian surname, and may refer to:

 Dragana Cvijić (born 1990), Serbian handball player
 Jovan Cvijić (1865–1927), Serbian geographer
 Lidija Cvijić (born 1998), Serbian handball player
 Srđan Cvijić (21st century), Serbian political scientist

Serbian surnames